Robert Dumitru Vancea (born 28 September 1976) is a Romanian former professional footballer who played as a midfielder for teams such as: FC U Craiova, JEF United Chiba, Extensiv Craiova and Pandurii Târgu Jiu, among others.

Club statistics

Honours

Player
 FC Universitatea Craiova
 Cupa României: Runner-up 1997–98

 Pandurii Târgu Jiu
 Divizia B: Winner 2004–05

External links
 
 
 

Living people
1976 births
Sportspeople from Craiova
Romanian footballers
Association football midfielders
CS Universitatea Craiova players
Liga I players
Liga II players
FC U Craiova 1948 players
FC Caracal (2004) players
FC Politehnica Timișoara players
CS Pandurii Târgu Jiu players
J1 League players
JEF United Chiba players
Romanian expatriate footballers
Romanian expatriate sportspeople in Japan
Expatriate footballers in Japan